Randy Travis is an American country music singer. His singles discography comprises 70 singles and 36 music videos.

Although Travis's first two singles, (including two which were credited under his birth name of Randy Traywick), fared poorly, Travis broke through on the country charts in 1985 with the single "1982", his second release for Warner Bros. Records. After this came a re-release of "On the Other Hand", which in 1985 became his first Number One country hit. Throughout the 1980s, Travis reached Number One with all but two of his single releases. His chart success continued into the mid-1990s, interrupted only by the two single releases from the side project Wind in the Wire, which both missed Top 40.

By 1996, Travis' chart success was waning, with none of the singles from Full Circle reaching higher than number 24. After this album, he switched to DreamWorks Records, where he charted three straight Top Ten hits from the album You and You Alone. After "Spirit of a Boy, Wisdom of a Man", however, he again lost chart momentum, and switched his focus to gospel music, signing to the Christian music label Word Records. Except for the Number One hit "Three Wooden Crosses" in 2002, Travis' Word Records releases have been largely unsuccessful at country radio. In 2009, Travis once again found Top Ten success when Carrie Underwood covered his 1988 hit "I Told You So" and re-released it as a duet with him.

Out of Travis's 70 solo singles, 16 have reached Number One on the U.S. Billboard country singles charts, and thirteen more have reached Top Ten. His longest-lasting Number One is "Hard Rock Bottom of Your Heart", which spent four weeks at the top of the country charts in 1990. Four of his solo singles have also had success on the Billboard Hot 100, with the highest being "Three Wooden Crosses" at number 31, although the Carrie Underwood duet reached number 9 on the same chart.

As lead artist

1970s and 1980s

1990s

2000s and 2010s

As featured artist

Music videos

Notes

References

Country music discographies
 
Discographies of American artists